Hyllisia shembaganurensis is a species of beetle in the family Cerambycidae. It was described by Breuning in 1982.

References

shembaganurensis
Beetles described in 1982
Taxa named by Stephan von Breuning (entomologist)